Akosua Serwaa (born 3 January 1981, in Kumasi) is a Ghanaian middle-distance runner who specializes in the 800 metres.

She finished seventh at the 2003 World Championships in Paris and won a silver medal at the 2003 All-Africa Games in Abuja.

Her personal best time is 1:59.60 minutes, achieved in July 2004 in Rome.

References

External links
 

1981 births
Living people
Ghanaian female middle-distance runners
Athletes (track and field) at the 2004 Summer Olympics
Olympic athletes of Ghana
African Games silver medalists for Ghana
African Games medalists in athletics (track and field)
Sportspeople from Kumasi
Athletes (track and field) at the 2003 All-Africa Games